Mecyclothorax rectangulus is a species of ground beetle in the subfamily Psydrinae. It was described by Louwerens in 1953.

References

rectangulus
Beetles described in 1953